Where Lights Are Low is a 1921 American silent drama film directed by Colin Campbell and starring Sessue Hayakawa, Tôgô Yamamoto, and Goro Kino.

Cast
 Sessue Hayakawa as Tsu Wong Shih 
Tôgô Yamamoto as Chang Bong Lo
 Goro Kino as Tuang Fang
 Gloria Payton as Quan Yin 
 Kiyosho Satow as Lang See Bow 
 Misao Seki as Chung Wo Ho Kee 
 Toyo Fujita as Wung
 Jay Eaton as 'Spud' Malone
 Harold Holland as Sergeant McConigle

References

Bibliography
 Donald W. McCaffrey & Christopher P. Jacobs. Guide to the Silent Years of American Cinema. Greenwood Publishing, 1999.

External links
 

1921 films
1921 drama films
1920s English-language films
American silent feature films
Silent American drama films
American black-and-white films
Films directed by Colin Campbell
Film Booking Offices of America films
1920s American films